Gossypetin, also known as 3,5,7,8,3',4'-hexahydroxyflavone, is a flavonol, a type of flavonoid. It has been isolated from the flowers and the calyx of Hibiscus sabdariffa (roselle) and exhibits a strong antibacterial activity. The compound has also been found to act as an antagonist of TrkB. Recently it was shown that gossypetin has radioprotective activity.

The enzyme 8-hydroxyquercetin 8-O-methyltransferase uses S-adenosyl methionine and gossypetin to produce S-adenosylhomocysteine and 3,5,7,3',4'-pentahydroxy-8-methoxyflavone.

In 2022, a study in an animal model using intragastric administration suggested that the flavonoid gossypetin facilitated the clearance of beta-amyloid in the brain and is a promising target for the study of treatments for Alzheimer's Disease by enhancing microglial phagocytic activity against Aβ.

See also 
 Tropomyosin receptor kinase B § Antagonists

References 

Aromatase inhibitors
Catechols
Flavonols
Hydroxyquinols
TrkB antagonists